Farrokh Bolagh may refer to:
 Farrokh Bolagh, East Azerbaijan, village in Iran
 Farrokh Bolagh, Hamadan, village in Iran